is a mountain pass at the north end of the Hidaka Mountains of Hokkaidō, Japan. Snow is possible on the pass from October to May. Japan National Route 38 crosses the pass between Minamifurano and Shintoku.

The name of the pass was derived from taking elements from both Ishikari Province as well as Tokachi Province. Its history can be traced back to the Edo period, when it was the first road to pass through the Hidaka Mountains.

References

Mountain passes of Japan